DSB Øresund was a Danish railway company which was the successor of what was left of DSBFirst Denmark. DSB Øresund operated train services on the tendered Coast Line and half of the train services between Copenhagen Central Station and Malmö via the Øresund Bridge. The other half of the cross-border service was operated by Transdev. On 13 December 2015, DSB took over operation of all activities from DSB Øresund A/S.

References

Defunct railway companies of Denmark
Transport companies based in Copenhagen